Sky Network may refer to:

Sky Television (New Zealand), a pay television service in New Zealand, which is also referred to as Sky Network Television
Sky UK, a British pay television company

See also
Skynet (disambiguation)